Jessica Gal (born 6 July 1971) is a Dutch former judoka. She competed at the 1992, 1996 and the 2000 Summer Olympics.

References

External links
 

1971 births
Living people
Dutch female judoka
Olympic judoka of the Netherlands
Judoka at the 1992 Summer Olympics
Judoka at the 1996 Summer Olympics
Judoka at the 2000 Summer Olympics
Sportspeople from Amsterdam
20th-century Dutch women
21st-century Dutch women